Vladimir Matić (Serbian Cyrillic: Владимир Матић; born 12 July 1983) is a Serbian professional footballer who plays as a striker. He is best remembered for his time at BSK Borča, making over 100 league appearances and scoring 24 goals for the side.

During his journeyman career, Matić played for numerous clubs in his homeland, also having two brief spells abroad in Armenia and Montenegro.

Honours
BSK Borča
 Serbian First League: 2008–09

External links
 
 

Armenian Premier League players
Association football forwards
Expatriate footballers in Armenia
Expatriate footballers in Montenegro
FC Gandzasar Kapan players
FK BSK Batajnica players
FK BSK Borča players
FK Dolina Padina players
FK Novi Pazar players
FK Smederevo players
Montenegrin First League players
OFK Grbalj players
Serbian expatriate footballers
Serbian expatriate sportspeople in Armenia
Serbian expatriate sportspeople in Montenegro
Serbian First League players
Serbian footballers
Serbian SuperLiga players
Footballers from Belgrade
1983 births
Living people